is an anime and manga series based on the Mega Man Battle Network series by Capcom, both using the same name but heavily diverging from each other in terms of plot. The manga series was written by Ryo Takamisaki and ran in Shogakukan's CoroCoro Comic between 2001 and 2006, while the anime television series, produced by Xebec, Nihon Ad Systems and TV Tokyo, ran for five seasons on TV Tokyo in Japan between March 2002 and September 2006, reaching  episodes in total, as well as a feature film. Viz Media would license the series for distribution in North America, including all the main chapters of the manga between 2004 and 2008, while the anime would only have its first season and Axess aired on Kids' WB! from 2003 to 2005.

MegaMan NT Warrior takes place in an unspecified year of the 21st century ("200X") in which the internet has rapidly progressed and is now the driving force of everyday life. Users are able to interact with the internet using PErsonal Terminals (PETs) handhelds and Net Navigators, online avatars with special functionalities including the ability to delete Viruses using Battle Chips. NT Warrior focuses on Lan Hikari and his NetNavi MegaMan.EXE in which they, alongside their friends attempt to stop the villain (initially the crime organization World Three, before diverging later on) from taking over or destroying the world. Both adaptations were commissioned alongside the first game's development in order to ensure the series' success.

MegaMan NT Warrior was a success; during its run, the anime drew high viewership in North America and Japan, while the manga adaptation would see monthly sales up to 1.5 million. In 2022, as part of promotion for the upcoming Mega Man Battle Network Legacy Collection, it was announced that both the Japanese and English dubs of the anime would be re-released onto the official YouTube channel.

Plot

Setting and characters 

The series focuses on Lan Hikari and his NetNavi, MegaMan.EXE as they build their friendship while dealing with threats from various NetCrime organizations. Along with Lan are friends Maylu Sakurai, Dex Ogreon, Yai Ayano, Tory Froid, and their respective Navis: Roll, GutsMan, Glide, IceMan. Although the series originally remains fairly close to the original Battle Network in terms of storyline, it begins to diverge greatly partway into the series. For example, there is no evidence showing that Lan and MegaMan were twin brothers in the anime, unlike in the games where it is revealed near the end of the first Battle Network game.

Manga 
After a series of attacks by World Three leaves Lan in a short coma, he is revealed to have the rare ability of Full-Synchro—a state where the operator and Navi's minds merge together allowing for quicker reactions at the cost of any damage on the Navi also being inflicted on the operator. Due to this, he is given a Net-Battler license and defeats the World Three with MegaMan seemingly being deleted. He eventually recovers MegaMan from the Undernet and fight the remnants of World Three, only to be suddenly attacked by the "God of Destruction" Bass. They are swiftly defeated, but promise each other to improve their skills for an eventual rematch. Both soon enter an ancient pyramid and encounter PharaohMan, a NetNavi coming from an ancient civilization who bestows them the power of Hub-Style upon his deletion.

Upon hearing about the news, fellow NetBattler Chaud Blaze challenges Lan to a NetBattle, which is interrupted by Grave member Arashi Kazefuki destroying Lan's PET and sending a Hub Style-powered MegaMan on a temporary rampage while Lan is left in an unconscious state. He is eventually revived with the help of Kei Yuki, however Lan's PET is left with a lock preventing him from jacking-in until his school is attacked on a cruise ship. Kei Yuki reveals himself as Sean Obihiro, leader of Gospel, who is focused on capturing the Hub Style ability. Upon transforming into the multi-bug organism known as the Grave Virus Beast, Bass reappears and challenges MegaMan to a rematch; he is able to absorb Hub Style's ability, but is eventually deleted. Later, FireMan attacks the school again, but transform into FlameMan and is able to negate Hub Style's power with dark powers.

Anime 
EXE is roughly split into two separate storylines. The first concerns the original World Three and Mr. Wily's plan on finding the Ultimate NetNavi, culminating in the N1 Grand Prix, a NetBattling tournament. At its conclusion, the Ultimate NetNavi PharaohMan awakens from his slumber and proceeds to claim the net as his own, deleting MegaMan in the process. PharaohMan would eventually be weakened by the two tournament finalists, ProtoMan and a newly rebuilt MegaMan, leading to his capture by Wily. The second half of the season has the characters take on Grave, a NetMafia syndicate spearheaded by Wily that seeks to create a virus beast with the capability to destroy the net.

Months later, Lan's father Yuichiro Hikari completes his research on the Synchro Chip, a device that enables Operators and NetNavis to become one through the use of Cross Fusion. This development coincides with a plot by Nebula (led by the notorious Dr. Regal) and the Darkloids to take over both the human and cyberworlds. Lan manages to use the then-untested Synchro Chip to Cross Fuse with MegaMan and defeat the Darkloids that materialize in the real world with the aid of Dimensional Area Generators. Because of this, Lan is invited to become a NetSaver (Net Savior), an Official NetBattler charged with protecting the net. As a result of Cross Fusion, MegaMan loses his Style Change option, but instead gains the ability to use Double Soul (Soul Unison) with which allows him to combine his powers with other NetNavis.

Following the end of Axess, Duo, a being from outer space who seeks to destroy humanity after witnessing the chaos caused by Dr. Regal, appears. Intrigued by Cross Fusion, he decides to spare mankind temporarily, bestowing a test upon the main characters to assess whether or not humans truly merit survival. He sends his subordinate, Slur, to Earth, where she hands Navis possessing the powers of Duo's asteroid to unsuspecting people to observe what they will do with such might. Lan and the other net saviors must work together to foil Duo and his subordinate. In the process, Neo WWW is formed by Tesla Gauss to cause havoc. Dr. Regal also returns during the movie, and again towards the end of Stream, with the focus of Stream shifting to time travel.

Beast introduces the warring Cybeasts Gregar and Falzar, as well as the Navi Trill. Pitted against the newly emerged Zoanoroid armies of the Cybeasts, Lan, MegaMan, and a select group of their partners, find themselves drawn into the parallel world of Beyondard. Guided by a mysterious girl, Iris, they join the human resistance in the fight to claim the "Synchronizer" powers of Trill, with which MegaMan is able to "Beast Out". Nearing the end of Beast, the android brain belonging to Wily of Beyondard reveals himself along with his lackeys, Blackbeard and Yuika, hoping to acquire the victor Cybeast as his new body. Ultimately, the two merge into the Super Cybeast Grezar, which becomes Wily's vessel with assistance from Trill's powers. MegaMan and Trill merge and lend their strength to Lan to form a "Juuka Style," giving him the strength to destroy it.

Beast+ consists of a string of arcs beginning with the appearance of the Professor and Zero (both from Mega Man Network Transmission). An ex-WWW member, the Professor recovers the remains of Gregar, intent on reviving it for his own purposes. Following its deletion and Zero's decision to break ties with his master, the second arc takes place. The vengeful Professor, however, later resurfaces, unleashing a new subordinate known as Zero One. Moved by the kindness that has been shown to him, Zero sacrifices himself to put a stop to the Professor once and for all. The storyline then continues toward its finale with the introduction of Cache, the final boss of the Japan-exclusive mobile game Phantom of Network, who threatens to consume the world with the aid of Phantom Navis and cache data before being defeated by Cross-Fusion MegaMan.

Media

Manga

The MegaMan NT Warrior manga series was written and illustrated by Ryo Takamisaki and published in the Shogakukan magazine CoroCoro Comic; Takamisaki stated the decision for a loose adaptation was requested by Capcom early on in its development, since they felt a direct adaptation would be too boring for readers. Prior to the first game's release, Takamisaki was only able to access press material, and had to base the setting off what he had until he was able to obtain a copy, at which point he went back and reworked anything that contradicted the lore.

A total of 13 tankōbon (bound volumes) were published in Japan from July 2001 to November 2006. All 13 volumes of the series were licensed in North America by Viz Media and published between May 19, 2004, and February 5, 2008.

Anime

The anime adaptation first aired on TV Tokyo March 4, 2002. It spawned four sequels, Axess, Stream, Beast, and Beast+. The total number of episodes between all 5 series is 209. There was also a feature film within the Stream storyline subtitled Program of Light and Darkness. Only the first and second (Axess) series were adapted into English. The English adaptation was produced by Viz Media and recorded by Ocean Productions; it was announced by Warner Bros. on February 14, 2003, and first aired May 17, 2003, on Kids' WB in the United States and Teletoon in Canada. After airing just 13 episodes, the series went on hiatus before continuing on May 1, 2004, with 26 more episodes.

The English adaptation of Axess aired in February 2005 in the United States and April 2005 in Canada, with the first episode airing as a "sneak preview" on November 22, 2004. It would be dropped and revived only to complete the final episodes from Axess before dropping it once more, leaving the series unfinished. In May 2005, it was announced that the anime would be licensed for Latin American regions in summer 2005. As with many anime series airing at the time, MegaMan NT Warrior underwent censorship; in particular, names relating to either fire or explosives were changed to remove such references.

For South-East Asian countries, Voiceovers Unlimited produced an alternate English dub using the original Japanese terms, opening, and ending themes; unlike the Viz Media adaptation, this dub was completely uncensored.

Film
The movie, was shown alongside the Duel Masters feature film, Duel Masters: Curse of the Deathphoenix, as part of a double-billing March 12, 2005 in Japan. The film itself is set during the events of the franchise's third season, Stream

Music 
Japanese opening themes
 by Jin Hashimoto (EXE)
 by Michihiro Kuroda (Axess)
"Be Somewhere" by Buzy (Stream)
 by Dandelion (Beast)

Japanese ending themes
"Piece of Peace" by mica (EXE, eps 1-25)
 by Shōtarō Morikubo (EXE, eps 26-56)
 by Kumiko Higa and Akiko Kimura (Axess)
 by Babamania (Stream, eps 1-25)
 by Kumiko Higa and Akiko Kimura (Stream, eps 26-51)
 by Clair (Beast)

Merchandise

Merchandising for the Rockman.EXE series was heavy in Japan with a variety of toys. Toys ranged from action figures and plush dolls to board games and trading cards. Many toys were originally released by Bandai, including an electronic Plug-In PET replica of the PET used in the original EXE, but Takara took over with merchandising starting with Axess. Electronic PET toys have since been released with every new model used in the show: Advanced PET and Advanced PET II (Axess), Progress PET (Stream), and Link PET and Link PET_EX (Beast and Beast+). Battle Chips for use in the PETs are often packaged with other merchandise, including action figures and even Japanese installments of Battle Network video games.

Most of the merchandise remains Japan-exclusive. However, to help promote the English version of the anime series, Mattel created a line of original MegaMan NT Warrior action figures for the U.S. market. The series were released in two waves with a third wave planned but never released. The action figures featured many prominent characters from the anime with detachable limbs—interchangeable with other figures—so that Battle Chip weaponry could be attached. Mattel also released all twelve DoubleSoul MegaMan figures (featured in Battle Network 4 and Axess) with detachable armor, as well as various miniature figurines (usually depicted in battle) and a few taller figurines, including a talking CrossFusion MegaMan figure.

Furthermore, the Advanced PET toy (featured in Axess) was imported in three available designs: blue/gray (MegaMan), red/black (ProtoMan), and black/purple (Bass). The Advanced PET II model was planned but never released. English Battle Chips were packaged with nearly every piece of MegaMan NT Warrior merchandise, but chips could also be bought separately in booster packs. Japanese and English Battle Chips will work on either Japanese or English versions of the PETs, although only the Progress PET featured backwards compatibility with previous generations of Battle Chips.

In 2004, Decipher also distributed a trading card game in the United States called "MegaMan NT Warrior Trading Card Game". However, it was not a translation of the pre-existing trading card games in Japan. Three sets were released before the game was discontinued in 2005, after the end of the Mega Man Battle Network video games.

In Japan, various soundtracks have been released featuring background music and theme songs used in the show. Also, every episode of the anime has been released across sixty-five DVDs usually containing three episodes per disc. In the United States, thirteen DVDs have been released covering the original 52 episodes of EXE. The first six volumes were also released in VHS form. The English version of Axess has yet to be released on DVD.

Other merchandise includes a life-sized Mega Buster that fires foam darts, an original MegaMan NT Warrior-themed board game, and MegaMan.EXE Halloween costumes.

Reception
MegaMan NT Warrior achieved popularity among Japanese viewing audiences. According to a viewership sample conducted in the Kantō region by Video Research, the anime drew in an average of 4.5% and a maximum of 5.9% of households during the last year of its original run. During the English dub's run, Kids' WB! wrote that the series had outperformed all competitors with similar demographics. The manga adaptation reportedly sold 1.5 million units per volume in Japan alone.

The MegaMan NT Warrior: Program of Light and Dark and Duel Masters: Curse of the Deathphoenix double feature ranked first for the weekend ending March 13, 2005, dethroned Lorelei: The Witch of the Pacific Ocean from the first place and broke the record for spring break in Japan with a gross of US$12,708,498. This record lasted for 5 weeks until Constantine broke the record with a gross of US$14,859,234 on April 17, 2005, and dropped to ranked fifth at the Japanese box office for the weekend ending March 20, 2005, with a gross of $1,093,870 USD. The following week it dropped to seventh place with US$559,800 and a cumulative box office gross of US$6,178,840 at three weeks of release.

See also
 List of television shows based on video games
 Mega Man Star Force (anime)

Notes

References

External links

 MegaMan NT Warrior official website
 ShoPro's Rockman EXE website 
 TV Tokyo's Rockman EXE website 
 TV Tokyo's Rockman EXE Axess website 
 TV Tokyo's Rockman EXE Stream website 
 TV Tokyo's Rockman EXE Beast website 
 Rockman-exe Online fansite
 

2001 manga
2002 anime television series debuts
2003 anime television series debuts
2004 anime television series debuts
2005 anime films
2005 anime television series debuts
2006 anime television series debuts
Japanese children's animated action television series
Japanese children's animated science fiction television series
Japanese children's animated superhero television series
Animated series based on Mega Man
IG Port franchises
Capcom franchises
Children's manga
Mega Man Battle Network
Science fiction anime and manga
Shogakukan franchises
Shōnen manga
TV Tokyo original programming
Viz Media anime
Viz Media manga
Xebec (studio)
Television series about siblings
Anime television series based on video games
Manga based on video games
Television censorship in the United States